The St. Albert Merchants are a Canadian Junior B ice hockey team located in St. Albert, Alberta. They play in the Capital Junior Hockey League out of the Akinsdale Arena. They are coached by Niall O’Donoghue.

The Merchants have won a total of six league titles, including four consecutive championships from 1994–95 to 1997–98. The Merchants are two time Alberta Junior B provincial champions, winning the Russ Barnes Trophy in 1986 and 1996, advancing to the Keystone Cup Junior B championships for Western Canada.

History

The Merchants were founded in 1983. They won the league championship, and the provincial championship, in 1985-86, their third year. They won the league championship again in the 1987-88, before finishing second at the provincials. They won the league championship again the next two years, and again in 1994-95. They repeated, yet again, in 1995-96, winning the provincial title, before finishing runner-up at the 1996 Keystone Cup. In 1996-97, the Merchants went undefeated in the regular season, before winning the league championship yet again. The following season, they finished second in the first edition of the new provincial championship, the champion of whom now won the Russ Barnes Trophy. They made the provincials again the next season, before losing in the provincial semi-finals. Since the turn of the century, the Merchants have had a number of difficult seasons, interspersed by a league title in 2004-05. They often did not progress past the first round in many seasons, before the 2012-13 season, when they returned to the league final, where they lost to the Sherwood Park Knights. They made the league final again the following year, losing again, this time to the Fort Saskatchewan Hawks. In 2014-15, they finished first in their division, but were upset in the second round by the Stony Plain Flyers. In January 2014, the Merchants donated all admission ticket sales and money raised from the 50/50 draw to the local RCMP station, in an act of remembrance for the RCMP officer killed in a shooting outside a St. Albert casino the previous year.

Franchise Regular Season leader in goals- Matt Havens(72) 

Franchise Regular Season leader in assists- Casey Reid(132)

Franchise Regular Season leader in points- Casey Reid(202)

Franchise Regular Season leader in penalty- Chris Clark(360)

Franchise Regular Season leader in games played- Daniel Rombough(115)

Franchise playoff leader in goals- Casey Reid(16)

Franchise playoff leader in assists- Casey Reid(25)

Franchise playoff leader in points- Casey Reid(41)

Franchise playoff leader in penalty minutes- Jared Kwasney(91)

Franchise playoff leader in games played- Casey Reid(43)

Recent Season-by-season record

Note: GP = Games played, W = Wins, L = Losses, T = Ties, OTL = Overtime Losses, Pts = Points, GF = Goals for, GA = Goals against

Records as of 2016-17 season.

See also

List of ice hockey teams in Alberta

References

External links

Team Website

Ice hockey teams in Alberta
Ice hockey clubs established in 1983
Sport in St. Albert, Alberta
1983 establishments in Alberta